Remikiren is a renin inhibitor under development for the treatment of hypertension (high blood pressure). It was first developed by Hoffmann–La Roche in 1996.

References

Renin inhibitors
Cyclopropanes
Cyclohexyl compounds